Naval Weapons Station Earle is a United States Navy base in Monmouth County, New Jersey, United States. Its distinguishing feature is a  pier in Sandy Hook Bay where ammunition can be loaded and unloaded from warships at a safe distance from heavily populated areas.

The areas are connected by Normandy Road, a  military road and rail line.

History
World War II operations demanded an ammunition depot near the greater New York metropolitan area but away from high-population sectors. Planning was hastened in early 1943 after the ammunition ship SS El Estero caught fire while moored in Bayonne, New Jersey. If the stowed and dockside explosives had detonated at once, in the manner of the great Halifax Explosion, the blast could have damaged parts of Bayonne and even Lower Manhattan.  A board was established to locate a suitable site, and chose Sandy Hook Bay, which featured a safe, sheltered, and nearby port where ships could take on ammunition. Rail lines could bring in the ammunition from the west, where the majority of ammunition shipments originated. The rural area meant few local residents would be affected.

On August 2, 1943, construction began on Naval Ammunition Depot Earle, named after Rear Admiral Ralph Earle, the chief of the Bureau of Ordnance during World War I. The depot was commissioned on December 13, 1943, though work continued on the military road and railway connecting the mainside complex, the waterfront complex and the pier, which stretches  into the Sandy Hook Bay.

Earle continued to develop after World War II, keeping pace with the changing needs of the navy. In 1974, the depot's name was changed to Naval Weapons Station Earle.

School-aged children of active military personnel at the station in grades K through 8 attend the schools of the Tinton Falls School District. Students in grades 9 through 12 attend Monmouth Regional High School in Tinton Falls, part of the Monmouth Regional High School District.

NWS Earle is also the homeport to USNS Supply (T-AOE 6), USNS Arctic (T-AOE-8), and Combat Logistics Squadron 2.

Facilities 

Mainside: The  in Colts Neck house most of Earle's departments and facilities. The Navy Munitions Command, Detachment Earle, performs the station's primary mission: storing and providing ammunition to the fleet. Military and civilian personnel operate the inland storage, renovation, transshipment and demilitarization facilities.
Waterfront: At the Waterfront Complex, the Navy Munitions Command provides ammunition for nearly every class of ship operated by the navy and United States Coast Guard as well as commercial vessels from other countries.
Pier Complex: The station's pier complex is one of the longest "finger piers" in the world. A two-mile (3 km) trestle connects to three finger piers. One mile from the shore the trestle branches off to Pier 1. At the junction of Piers 2, 3 and 4, a concrete platform supports a forklift/battery-recharging shop and the port operations building. This area is known as the "wye."

See also
PS Alexander Hamilton

References

External links

Naval Weapons Station Earle at the Commander, Navy Region Mid-Atlantic official website
Historic American Engineering Record (HAER) documentation, filed under Sandy Hook Bay, Colts Neck, Monmouth County, NJ:

Weapons and ammunition installations of the United States Navy
Military installations in New Jersey
Buildings and structures in Monmouth County, New Jersey
Historic American Engineering Record in New Jersey
Raritan Bayshore
Piers in New Jersey
Colts Neck Township, New Jersey
Howell Township, New Jersey
Middletown Township, New Jersey
Tinton Falls, New Jersey
Wall Township, New Jersey
Earle
Earle
1943 establishments in New Jersey
Military installations established in 1943